The Agimat ng Masa, also known as the Agimat Partylist, is a political organization seeking party-list representation in the House of Representatives of the Philippines.

Background
The Agimat ng Masa was formally established as a social organization in 2011 by actor-politician Ramon Revilla Sr. It has been conducting programs for the needy and disaster victims prior to its registration as a partylist organization. This includes health, livelihood, and education programs.

Electoral history

2022 elections
Agimat participated in the 2022 elections, vying to win at least a seat in the House of Representatives. It characterize itself as a multi-sector partylist since it aims to cater to the interests of various groups including the private and public sector, farmers, fisherfolks, professionals, small to medium scale industry workers, the elderly, the youth, and the persons with disabilities. Agimat has come up with a Workers, Health and Economic Agenda which it seeks to implement once elected

Agimat's campaign benefitted from Agimat ng Agila which starred Bong Revilla according to the actor's son and partylist nominee Bryan Revilla. Bryan remarked that the popularity of the series as well as the association of "Agimat" to his grandfather Ramon Revilla Sr helped provide name recall to potential voters. Bong Revilla himself also helped in the campaign.

The group managed to secure a seat after garnering 586,909 votes. The seat is to be filled by Bryan Revilla the fifth nominee. While Revilla has stated that Agimat's first to fourth nominees have withdrawn after the partylist was proclaimed, he has been presented by Agimat as its first nominee.

Electoral performance

Representatives to Congress

References

Party-lists represented in the House of Representatives of the Philippines
2011 establishments in the Philippines
Political parties in the Philippines